Levan Nikoleishvili (born 1967) is a retired Georgian colonel who served as the Chief of the General Staff of the Georgian Armed Forces from February 2005 to November 2006. He then served as a deputy defense minister until his resignation in August 2007.

References 

|-

Military personnel from Georgia (country)
Living people
1967 births